The 1969 World Table Tennis Championships were held in Munich from April 17 to April 27, 1969. It was the 30th edition to be contested.

During the Cultural Revolution, Chinese sports professionals were denounced as 'Sprouts of Revisionism and were denied places at the 1967 World Table Tennis Championships and 1969 World Table Tennis Championships. Players such as Jung Kuo-tuan were persecuted and he committed suicide in 1968. Had China competed in both championships and not lost the impetus gained in the previous decade they would surely have dominated the World Championships.

Medalists

Team

Individual

References

External links
ITTF Museum

 
World Table Tennis Championships
World Table Tennis Championships
World Table Tennis Championships
Table tennis competitions in Germany
International sports competitions hosted by West Germany
1960s in Munich
April 1969 sports events in Europe
Sports competitions in Munich